Entronque de Herradura is one of thirteen villages and consejo popular ("people's council", i.e. hamlet) belonging to the municipality of Consolación del Sur, in Pinar del Río Province, Cuba. It has a land extension of 1.280 km² (0.494 square of miles).

Geography
It covers the northeast part of Consolación del Sur, bordered on the north by the municipality of La Palma and Los Palacios, east of Canal, on the south by the border of Herradura, by the West with the district of Crucero de Echeverria.

Demographics
It has a population about 6,086 inhabitants with a density of 4,755 inhabitants per km². It is considered as an “Urban Settlement”.

See also
List of places in Cuba
Municipalities of Cuba

References

External links

Entronque de Herradura on EcuRed

Populated places in Pinar del Río Province
Consolación del Sur